Joan Paul Ramos (22 May 1990 – 17 February 2019) was an Argentine professional footballer who played as a defender.

Club career
Belgrano gave Ramos his senior start, after signing him in 1998. He was sent off on his professional debut in Primera B Nacional against Patronato on 8 August 2010, receiving two yellow cards inside seven minutes of each other; in a fixture that saw three other sending offs. Ramos appeared sixteen times, along with his first senior goal versus Boca Unidos in October, as Belgrano won promotion to the Primera División. He stayed for two further seasons, but did not make a further appearance in the league – though he was an unused substitute six times. In June 2013, Ramos joined Racing de Córdoba of Torneo Argentino B.

One year later, on 30 June 2014, Torneo Federal A's Mitre signed Ramos. He made four appearances in league and cup in 2014, before sealing a return to tier four with Racing de Córdoba. Ahead of January 2017, Ramos switched Argentina for Peru after agreeing terms with Sport Loreto. He participated in sixteen fixtures for the Segunda División side, while also scoring goals in matches with César Vallejo and Sport Boys. Ramos returned to Argentina in 2018, completing a move to Gimnasia y Esgrima in Torneo Federal A; making fifteen appearances and netting two goals. His final games arrived during the 2018–19 campaign.

International career
In 2007, Ramos received a call-up to train with the Argentina U17s.

Personal life
In February 2019, it was announced that Ramos had died following a two-vehicle traffic collision on 17 February. Driving a Peugeot 207 in the early hours of Sunday morning, Ramos died at the scene having collided with a Chevrolet Agile carrying two occupants; who were rushed to hospital with trauma.

Career statistics

References

External links

1990 births
2019 deaths
Road incident deaths in Argentina
Footballers from Córdoba, Argentina
Argentine footballers
Association football defenders
Argentine expatriate footballers
Expatriate footballers in Peru
Argentine expatriate sportspeople in Peru
Primera Nacional players
Torneo Argentino B players
Torneo Federal A players
Peruvian Segunda División players
Club Atlético Belgrano footballers
Racing de Córdoba footballers
Club Atlético Mitre footballers
Sport Loreto players
Gimnasia y Esgrima de Concepción del Uruguay footballers